Fresno is the fifth-largest city in California.

Fresno (ash tree in the Spanish language) may also refer to:

Places
 Colombia
 Fresno, Tolima

 Spain
 Villanueva del Fresno, Badajoz, Extremadura
 Fresno, a ghost village in Nidáliga, Valle de Sedano, Burgos
 Aldea del Fresno, Madrid
 Fresno de la Vega, Ribera del Esla, León
 Fresno el Viejo, Tierra del Vino, Valladolid

 United States
 Fresno, alternate name of Pueblo de las Juntas, California
 Fresno, California
 Fresno, Ohio
 Fresno, Texas

Entertainment
 Fresno (band), pop-rock band from Porto Alegre, Rio Grande do Sul, Brazil
 Fresno (movie), a 2015 film by Jamie Babbit, starring Natasha Lyonne and Judy Greer.
 Fresno (TV miniseries), 1986 parody of night-time soap operas starring Carol Burnett and Dabney Coleman

Food
 Fresno chile, a cultivar of Capsicum annuum

Machines
 Fresno scraper, earth-moving machine

Titles
 Marquess of Villanueva del Fresno, an ancient title of nobility in the Kingdom of Spain.

War ships
 , United States Navy cruiser
 , United States Navy amphibious assault landing ship tanker

See also
 Fresnillo